Insurial Americas, Inc or  Insurial was an American multinational corporation headquartered in Manhattan, New York City, New York, United States. The company invested in and operated the group's wholly owned subsidiaries and branches in the United Arab Emirates, China, Pakistan, Japan, and India. Insurial Americas, Inc also participated in Asia-Pacific transactions through the group's Hong Kong-based equities arm. The group's primary areas of operations were trade finance, trade negotiations, inspections, and logistics. The group's estimated revenues, prior to its merger with an undisclosed entity, were in excess of $400 million.

Sources

Press
 Insurial Americas expands in Middle East Trade Finance Magazine (October 2012)
 Insurial Americas Inc's China Subsidiary Acquires Sizeable Customer Base for Trade Discounts San Francisco Chronicle
 Insurial Americas negotiates $20 million trade credit with lenders and investors American Public Media

Business services companies of the United States
Companies based in New York City